Rebecca May (born 20 January 2002) is an English footballer who plays as a midfielder for FA WSL club Manchester United.

Club career 
May joined the Manchester United youth setup at under-10 level, progressing through the age groups. She was part of the club's development team that competed in the WSL Academy Cup in the 2018–19 season, losing out to Arsenal in the final. The following season, May saw frequent playing time as the club entered a full-time under-21 team to compete in the FA WSL Academy League for the first time.

In January 2020, May featured in a senior matchday squad for the first time as an unused substitute in the League Cup semi-final defeat to Chelsea. Four days later, on 2 February 2020, May made her senior debut as an 85th minute substitute, replacing Jane Ross in a 1–1 FA WSL draw away to Reading.

On 9 March 2022, May played in the under-21s in the FA WSL Academy Cup final and scored in the 4–1 win over Birmingham City.

International career 
May has been capped by England at under-17 level. On 21 March 2019, she scored her first goal in an 8–0 UEFA U17 qualifying win over Georgia. In May 2019, May was named to the squad traveling to Bulgaria to contest the 2019 UEFA Women's Under-17 Championship. May made two appearances as the team finished level on points with Germany and Netherlands but were eliminated at the group stage on a head-to-head goal difference tiebreaker. In March 2020, May was called up to the under-19 squad for the first time to compete in the La Manga tournament.

Career statistics

Club
.

References

External links 
 
 

2002 births
Living people
English women's footballers
Women's Super League players
Manchester United W.F.C. players
Women's association football midfielders
England women's youth international footballers